Thomas Humphrey may refer to:
Thomas Humphrey (cricketer), English cricketer
Tom Humphrey (artist) (1858–1922), Scottish-born Australian artist
Thomas E. Humphrey (born 1945), Chief Justice of the Maine Superior Court
Thomas M. Humphrey (born 1935), American economist
Thomas Humphrey (MP) (c. 1554–1624), English politician
 A fictional character from the series Orange is the New Black

See also

Thomas Humphreys (disambiguation)